Dugave is an urban settlement of the Croatian capital of Zagreb, within Novi Zagreb – istok District. Its neighbors are Travno, Sloboština and Hrelić, making Dugave the center of its district. The quarter itself has over 10,000 residents and two primary schools. It is the southernmost neighborhood in Novi Zagreb. The neighborhood is known for having a luxurious part known as the "Beverly Hills of Dugave".

History 
The assembly of the Novi Zagreb municipality made a decision in 1975 about the implementation of the urban neighborhood, and the first award for an ideal solution was given to Ivan Čižmek, Tomislav Odak, Tomislav Bilić and Zdenko Vazdar.

The setting stone for the commencement of the building of the new neighborhood in Zagreb was set on 25 May 1977. During its designing, the orthogonal way that some of the older neighborhoods in the city were built in was abolished.

Arrangement 
The neighborhood has a lot of green areas which makes it one of the more pleasant neighborhoods to live in. It is appropriate for children due to many playgrounds, parks and spots to play. The neighborhood has its own church, school, kindergarten, soccer club and library.

The dried out branch of the Sava river, Savišće, crosses through the neighborhood north-south.

The neighborhood is also the home of largest crest of GNK Dinamo Zagreb which is located next to the school.

Education 
Dugave has its own kindergarten, Vrtić Tratinčica (eng. Kindergarten Daisy), which consists of a main building near the center of the neighborhood and more buildings around Dugave. The kindergarten was founded in 1980.

The primary school in Dugave was built in 1980 also, bearing the name OŠ Josipa Kraša (eng. Josip Kraš Primary School). However, the demographic boom happened and the school had more students than it was allowed. Thus, in 1991, the school was divided into two schools: I. OŠ Dugave and II. OŠ Dugave (eng. Dugave Primary School 1 and Dugave Primary School 2). II. OŠ Dugave was later renamed into OŠ Frana Galovića (eng. Fran Galović Primary School). The two schools work together in the same building to this day, working in two shifts. The building itself has a peculiar shape consisting of three hexagonal-looking buildings, adjoined by an annex and a special building where the gyms and the locker rooms are. There are four fields behind the school: two for soccer and two for basketball. I. OŠ Dugave is a high quality primary school known for hardworking and intelligent students who excel in Math, Geography and Physics (courtesy of Pavo Majić). The school paper, Dugi, which stopped being published in the year 2009, got many critical acclaims and rewards, as well as the school's drama group. The school has been on TV many times; in 2008, one of the students of the 2nd grade won the televised learning competition Učilica for the first time in the year, and in 2013 the school was once again visited by a local TV company which presented it. A game of basketball was played amongst the two schools, with I. OŠ Dugave winning. OŠ Frana Galovića had a school paper, Crn-Bel, as well.

References

External links
 

Neighbourhoods of Zagreb
Novi Zagreb